Rukirabasaija Kato Rukidi I (kajjaju)was Omukama of the Kingdom of Toro, from 1871 until 1871. He was great and the fourth (4th) Omukama of Toro.

Biography

Claim to the throne
He was the fifth son of Rukirabasaija Kaboyo Omuhundwa Kasusunkwanzi Olimi I, the first Omukama of Toro who reigned between 1822 and 1865. He rebelled against his elder brother, Kyebambe Nyaika in 1871, with the help of an invading army from Buganda. He seized the throne and Omukama Nyaika fled and went into hiding.

Reign
His reign was a very short one. Some accounts say it lasted only two months. He was deposed by his subjects and his brother Kyebambe Nyaika returned to the throne.

Kato Rukidi 1 Rukirabasaija(Kajjaju)

went in masaka and he followed by his sister,he got aland in Bukakata kunya the land now days called Bujjaju after their he went to another place now days Bwala hill and people of Masaka called him KAJJAJU ,he started anew family at Bwala hill and this family Bwala mukirangira is still at this place. 
Rukirabasaija kato Rukidi 1  people of Buganda calls him Kajjaju,they named him kajjaju because people used to ask him "wanja  ndi masaka" and he replied them " kajjaju masaka muno" which means "naja njo masaka muno" (I came past days in Bush) and name masaka started their even the name.He costracted the new family in masaka now days calls Bwala hill Masaka city and after many years having grands he passed away.They buried him at Bwala hill near Bwala Masgd (amasiro ga Kato Rukidi1 Rukirabasaija Kajjaju )

Recoverd by  his grand son SSEBUNYA MOSES KAJJAJU director of KAJJAJU TRUST PHONES.  Facebook page MOSES MOSSY KKM SSEBUNYA,

Family
Nothing is written about the married life of Omukama Rukidi I.

Not much is written about the offspring of Omukama Kato  Rukidi I.

Succession table:First time

See also
 Omukama of Toro

References

Toro
19th-century rulers in Africa
1871 deaths
Year of birth unknown